Thep Xanh Nam Dinh Football Club (SNFC), commonly known as Nam Dinh, is a Vietnamese professional football club based in Nam Định that competes in the V.League 1.

History

Nam Định has two sports facilities, Thiên Trường Stadium (formerly Cuối Stadium) and Trần Quốc Toản Indoor Stadium, which are host to football and volleyball matches. Both sports centers are located on Hùng Vương Street.

At the beginning, the club's home crisis was a dust and sandy training ground of the militia forces where were usually called as Sân Dệt or the "stadium" of the Namdinh Spinning Factory. It was old crisis of the Vietnamese National Army's military academy.

From the end of 1970s, their home crisis was Thiên Trường Stadium. During the Vietnam War, this stadium was only a big and polluted pond with some vegetable fields. Formerly Sân Chùa-Cuối or the "Pagoda at end of the street" Stadium from one uninhibited temple which has got some daoist icons. So it was often named as "a factory weaves wishes" (nhà máy dệt giấc mơ).

Before 1997, club costumes always used home colors black-white which were similar like Juventus FC. It originates from name Namha Youths, so during the 1980-1990s they were called as "Vietnamese Juventus" by sport medias. However, after some changing times due to sponsor replacements, it was fixed as the yellow, then added lime-red.

Hà Nam Ninh won the National Football Champions (V.League) in 1985 with star player Nguyễn Văn Dũng.

In 2001, Nam Định took second place in the National Championships, losing to Bình Định F.C. In 2007, the Nam Định football team changed its name to Đạm Phú Mỹ Nam Định and won its first National Cup under its new name. In 2009 the Nam Định Football team changed its name to Megastar Nam Định F.C and failed in standing on V.League to 1st level tournament 2010.

The name of club was also changed 10 times due to sponsor replacements :

Le Cotonkin CF (Đội túc cầu Cotonkin, 1930s – 1945)
Namha Youths FC (Đội bóng tròn Thanh niên Nam Hà, 1965 – 1978)
Hanamninh Industry FC (Đội bóng đá Công nghiệp Hà Nam Ninh, 1978 – 1991)
Namha FC (CLB BĐ Nam Hà, 1991 – 1996)
Namdinh FC (CLB BĐ Nam Định, 1997 – 2003)
Songda-Namdinh FC (CLB BĐ Sông Đà-Nam Định, 2003 – 2006)
Mikado-Namdinh FC (CLB BĐ Mikado-Nam Định, 2006 – 2007)
Phumy Fertilizer-Namdinh FC (CLB BĐ Đạm Phú Mĩ-Nam Định, 2007 – 2008)
Mikado-Namdinh FC (CLB BĐ Mikado-Nam Định, 2006 – 2007)
Megastar-Namdinh FC (CLB BĐ Megastar-Nam Định, 2009 – 2011)
Mikado-Namdinh FC (CLB BĐ Mikado-Nam Định, 2011 – 2013)
Namdinh FC (CLB BĐ Nam Định, 2013 – 2019)
Namha Pharma-Namdinh FC (CLB BĐ Dược Nam Hà-Nam Định, 2019 – 2020)
Namdinh FC (CLB BĐ Nam Định, 2021 – 2022)
Thepxanh-Namdinh FC (CLB BĐ Thép Xanh-Nam Định, 2023 to present)

From 2003 to present, the club currently competes in the V.League with a sponsor of former minister Đinh La Thăng as a businessman, the top flight of Vietnamese football.

Current squad
As of 17 January 2023

Current coaching staff

Performance in AFC competitions
 AFC Champions League: 1 appearance
2008: Group stage

Season-by-season record

Achievements

National competitions

League
V.League 1:
 Winners :       1985
 Runners-up :  2000–01, 2004
V.League 2:
 Winners : 2017
Second League:
 Winners : 2014
Cup
Vietnamese Cup:
 Winners : 2007

Other competitions
China-ASEAN Cities Football Invitational Tournament:
 Winners : 2016
 Runners-up : 2017

Kit suppliers and shirt sponsors

See also

Phong Phú Hà Nam W.F.C. (female)
Bamboo Airways Thái Bình FC (amateur)
Vissai Ninh Bình FC (dissolved)

Footnotes

Notes

References

Further reading

Documents
Nam Định, thế và lực mới trong thế kỷ XXI −2005 p141 "A glance at the inauguration ceremony of Thiên Trường stadium (August 30th 2003)".

External links
 and YouTube
Namdinh Football Live Scores & Results
Namdinh the little fire of 2021 V-League
For joining-in NDFC, Nguyên Mạnh and Khắc Ngọc receive 10 billions VN$ ?
CLB Nam Định chi vài chục tỷ, chiêu mộ 7 "sao số" V.League
Văn Thanh, Hồng Duy chia tay HAGL, sắp gia nhập CLB Nam Định
Hậu vệ Văn Thanh đầu quân CLB Nam Định với "lót tay" 9 tỷ đồng ?
Nam Định chiêu mộ công thần của Hà Nội
Khán giả Nam Định tràn xuống sân 'xem giò' dàn sao mới tậu về sân Thiên Trường
Hồng Duy breaks-up HAGL to join in NDFC
Nguyễn Phong Hồng Duy mang tiền ký hợp đồng nhờ ba mẹ giữ để cưới vợ

Football clubs in Vietnam